Elefthero Prosfygon is a village of the Grevena municipality. Before the 1997 local government reform it was a part of the community of Elefthero. The 2011 census recorded 172 residents in the village.

Demographics
According to the 2011 census, the population of the settlement of Elefthero Prosfygon was 172 people, an increase of almost 14% compared to the previous census of 2001.

See also
 List of settlements in the Grevena regional unit

References

Populated places in Grevena (regional unit)